Sylvio Mendes Campos Júnior (born 12 April 1974), commonly known as Sylvinho (sometimes alternatively spelled Silvinho), is a Brazilian football manager and former player, currently managing Albania.

Formerly a left back, he began his career at Corinthians. He was signed by Arsenal of the Premier League in 1999, and was a popular player in his two seasons at the club. He left for Celta de Vigo of La Liga, before joining FC Barcelona in 2004, with whom he won the UEFA Champions League in 2006 and 2009 among other honours. He returned to England to spend his final season as a player with Manchester City in 2009–10.

Club career

Corinthians
Born in São Paulo, Brazil, Sylvinho started his career at Corinthians in 1994. With Timão, Sylvinho won the Copa do Brasil in 1995. He was also victorious with Corinthians in 1998's edition of Brazil's top flight league, the Campeonato Brasileiro Série A. Sylvinho as well won the Campeonato Paulista in 1995, 1997 & 1999 with Corinthians altogether.

Arsenal

In 1999, he became the first ever Brazilian player to sign for English club Arsenal, whom he signed for ahead of North London rivals Tottenham Hotspur who had made numerous offers for him. Before long he was first choice at left back, displacing long-time fan-favourite Nigel Winterburn. He had a setback early on in his first season when he missed a penalty in a shootout as Arsenal crashed out of the League Cup to Middlesbrough, and that season finished in similar heartbreak as Arsenal lost 4–1 on penalties against Turkish club Galatasaray in the 2000 UEFA Cup Final, although this time he did not take a penalty. During his second season at the club he was displaced by Ashley Cole. His stay only lasted for two years but in his short spell there he gained many friends and admirers and scored several spectacular goals including ones against Sheffield Wednesday, Charlton Athletic and Chelsea. He also scored twice in the Champions League for Arsenal against Sparta Prague and Spartak Moscow. In the 2000–01 season, Sylvinho was included in the PFA Team of the Year.

Celta Vigo
In 2001, he moved to Celta Vigo, and played there for three years, scoring once in the league against Barcelona on 26 January 2003, his future club. He became a popular figure with the club's fans, helping the team to qualify for the Champions League for the first time in their history during the 2003–04 season.

Sylvinho obtained a Spanish passport in 2004, granted to him after completing three years' residency in Spain. It allowed him to bypass the non-EU player restrictions in La Liga.

Barcelona
In 2004, after a transfer fee of €2 million, he was signed by FC Barcelona, where he won three domestic leagues, in 2005, 2006 and 2009, as well as the Champions League in 2006 and 2009. After a series of good performances in 2008, he was given an extension until 2009.

He played the entire match in Barcelona's 2–0 victory over defending champions Manchester United in the 2009 UEFA Champions League Final, ahead of the suspended Eric Abidal, previously having been an unused substitute in the final three years earlier. This was his final game for the Catalan club.

Manchester City
Manchester City visited the Camp Nou on 19 August 2009 and, having beaten Barcelona 1–0 in a friendly, held discussions about Sylvinho joining them at the end of the month, thereby joining up with countryman Robinho. It was announced on 24 August 2009 that he had signed for City on a free transfer, with a one-year contract. He made his debut against Scunthorpe United in the League Cup. His first league appearance came on 12 December 2009 against Bolton Wanderers, following the absence of an injured Wayne Bridge.
He scored his first goal for Manchester City in a 4–2 win against Scunthorpe in the FA Cup on 24 January 2010, with a spectacular long range strike.

On 8 June 2010, it was announced that Sylvinho's contract had expired and that he would be leaving the club, along with Benjani Mwaruwari, Jack Redshaw, Karl Moore and Martin Petrov.

International career
After receiving his first international call-up in 1997 under Mario Zagallo for a match against Russia, Sylvinho formed part of Brazil's squad for the CONCACAF Gold Cup of 1998 wherein as they eventually finished in third place, he thus won a bronze medal with the team. He thereafter made his international debut for Brazil in a friendly match against Wales at Cardiff on 23 May 2000, which ended in a 3–0 win. Four days later, he played in a friendly match against England in London, which ended in a 1–1 draw. He went on to achieve a total of 6 international caps, as a backup to Roberto Carlos at the left-back position. His last appearance with Brazil was on 28 March 2001 in a World Cup qualifier against Ecuador.

Managerial career
On 7 July 2011, Sylvinho announced he would be retiring from football. He was hired as Cruzeiro's assistant manager on 27 September 2011. After a stint on Sport Recife and Náutico, he returned to Corinthians on 5 July 2013, as assistant manager to Tite.

On 13 December 2014, he was appointed as Roberto Mancini's assistant coach by Italian club Inter Milan. On 20 July 2016, he joined the Brazil national team as an assistant once again to Tite. On 9 April 2019, he was appointed as manager of the Brazil national under-23 team ahead of the 2020 Summer Olympics, but did not take charge.

Lyon
On 19 May 2019, Sylvinho was announced as the replacement for Bruno Génésio at Olympique Lyonnais. He was sacked on 7 October 2019.

Corinthians
On 23 May 2021, Sylvinho's return to Corinthians as their new manager was announced. On 3 February of the following year, with only three matches into the new season, he was sacked after a 1–2 home defeat to rivals Santos.

Albania
On 2 January 2023, The Albanian Football Association announced that it had reached an agreement with Sylvinho to be the new head coach of the Albania national team and that Pablo Zabaleta and Doriva will join him as assistant coaches. Seven days later, he was officially appointed as the head coach and signed an 18-month contract, where the goal of the contract was to qualify for UEFA Euro 2024.

Style of play
A quick, reliable, and technically gifted attacking left back, Sylvinho was known in particular for his overlapping runs, as well as his crossing ability with his left foot; he also possessed good tactical awareness, defensive attributes, and concentration, which also enabled him to play as a midfielder, as a wing-back, or even as a winger occasionally.

Career statistics

Club

International

Managerial statistics

Honours
Corinthians
Campeonato Paulista: 1995, 1997, 1999
Campeonato Brasileiro Série A: 1998
Copa do Brasil: 1995

Arsenal
FA Community Shield: 1999

Barcelona
La Liga: 2004–05, 2005–06, 2008–09
Copa del Rey: 2008–09
Supercopa de España: 2005, 2006
UEFA Champions League: 2005–06, 2008–09

Brazil
CONCACAF Gold Cup third place: 1998

Individual
Premier League PFA Team of the Year: 2000–01

References

External links
 Sylvinho at Official FC Barcelona UK Penya
 

1974 births
Living people
Brazilian footballers
Footballers from São Paulo
Association football fullbacks
Sport Club Corinthians Paulista players
Arsenal F.C. players
RC Celta de Vigo players
FC Barcelona players
Manchester City F.C. players
Campeonato Brasileiro Série A players
Premier League players
La Liga players
UEFA Champions League winning players
Brazil international footballers
1998 CONCACAF Gold Cup players
Brazilian expatriate footballers
Brazilian expatriate sportspeople in England
Brazilian expatriate sportspeople in Spain
Expatriate footballers in England
Expatriate footballers in Spain
Naturalised citizens of Spain
Brazilian football managers
Olympique Lyonnais managers
Sport Club Corinthians Paulista managers
Albania national football team managers
Ligue 1 managers
Campeonato Brasileiro Série A managers
Brazilian expatriate football managers
Brazilian expatriate sportspeople in France
Expatriate football managers in France
Brazilian expatriate sportspeople in Albania
Expatriate football managers in Albania